Sphaerotherium is a genus of millipedes belonging to the family Sphaerotheriidae.

Species

 Sphaerotherium angulatum
 Sphaerotherium compessum
 Sphaerotherium compressa
 Sphaerotherium compressum
 Sphaerotherium convexum
 Sphaerotherium crassum
 Sphaerotherium delacyi
 Sphaerotherium digitale
 Sphaerotherium dorsale
 Sphaerotherium elegans
 Sphaerotherium elongatum
 Sphaerotherium forcipatum
 Sphaerotherium fraternum
 Sphaerotherium giganteum
 Sphaerotherium glabrum
 Sphaerotherium gronovii
 Sphaerotherium grossum
 Sphaerotherium hippocastanum
 Sphaerotherium immane
 Sphaerotherium insulanum
 Sphaerotherium intermedium
 Sphaerotherium klugii
 Sphaerotherium kochii
 Sphaerotherium kutorgae
 Sphaerotherium lamprimum
 Sphaerotherium latum
 Sphaerotherium leiosomum
 Sphaerotherium libidinosum
 Sphaerotherium lichtensteinii
 Sphaerotherium marginepunctatum
 Sphaerotherium microstictum
 Sphaerotherium nebulosum
 Sphaerotherium neptunus
 Sphaerotherium nigrum
 Sphaerotherium obtusum
 Sphaerotherium ovale
 Sphaerotherium pubescens
 Sphaerotherium punctulatum
 Sphaerotherium repulsum
 Sphaerotherium reticulatum
 Sphaerotherium retusum
 Sphaerotherium rotundatum
 Sphaerotherium rugulosum
 Sphaerotherium sakananum
 Sphaerotherium stigmaticum
 Sphaerotherium titanus
 Sphaerotherium walesianum
 Sphaerotherium weberii
 Sphaerotherium viride
 Sphaerotherium voeltzkowianum

References

External links
 Ispot

Sphaerotheriida
Millipedes of Africa